Ava (Persian: آوا) is a 2017 internationally co-produced drama film directed and written by Sadaf Foroughi. The film screened for the first time in the Discovery section at the 2017 Toronto International Film Festival, where it won the FIPRESCI Discovery Prize and received an Honourable Mention for Best Canadian First Feature Film.

In December, TIFF named the film on its annual Canada's Top Ten list of the ten best Canadian films. The film received eight Canadian Screen Award nominations at the 6th Canadian Screen Awards, including Best Picture, Best Director (Foroughi), Best Actress (Mahour Jabbari) and Best Supporting Actress (Bahar Noohian). It was named as the winner of the Canadian Screen Award for Best First Feature on 31 January 2018.

Plot
Ava is a student at an all-girl Iranian high school. She's an excellent student and good musician. But her mother hears a rumor that Ava has been seen with a boy, she overreacts and humiliates Ava. Her father is more supportive, but he often works out of the city. Her school's headmaster talks a lot about protecting her students, but she's clearly more concerned with the reputation of her school than the best interests of the girls in the school, and on several occasions threatens to expel Ava and other girls, often on the basis of unfounded rumors; she also cajoles students to snitch on each other.

Cast

Reception

Critical reception
On review aggregator website Rotten Tomatoes, the film holds an approval rating of 96%, based on 23 reviews, and an average rating of 7.45/10.

Accolades

References

External links
 

2017 films
2017 drama films
Iranian drama films
Canadian drama films
2010s Persian-language films
Best First Feature Genie and Canadian Screen Award-winning films
Films about Iranian Canadians
2010s Canadian films